Mars Horizon is a 2020 videogame by Auroch Digital about the Space Race.

Gameplay 
The player first selects a space agency: NASA, European Space Agency, Russia, China, and Japan. The support to the agency provides money, and a tech tree unlocks missions, buildings, and rocket parts. The missions are milestones from the space race, such as launching the first satellite, the first human to outer space, the first probes to the planets in the Solar System, the Moon landing, etc. The later stages of the game focus on proposed missions that were not achieved yet, such as the first Mars sample-return mission, and ends with the first human mission to Mars.

Creation
Mars Horizon is the result of a cooperation between Auroch Digital and the European Space Agency and the UK Space Agency. The development team stayed in facilities in Germany and the Netherlands, receiving firsthand experience on the development of space programs, specifically the ongoing projects to reach Mars. The interviews included staff from the ExoMars mission. Staff members from ESA provided in turn technical assistance, gameplay advice, and testing.

Reception
Joe Robinson from PCGamesN praised the success in capturing the wonder of space exploration with a strict hard science fiction approach, which he only saw at Kerbal Space Program (KSP). He pointed that the main difference was that in KSP the player flies the ships himself, while in Mars Horizon the game just jumps between screens, menus, and cutscene videos.

Elizabeth Howell from Space.com praised the presence of an aerospace engineering technology tree. She also considered that the game does a good job of adapting the history of space exploration, although it fails to make it clear that only the United States and Russia were significant researchers of it during its early days. She also considers that the gameplay makes the player face the hardships that real space agencies must face, such as the risk of expensive ships being damaged by unforeseen issues.

References

External links 
 Official site

2020 video games
Cold War video games
Construction and management simulation games
Fiction about the Solar System
Historical simulation games
Turn-based strategy video games